There have been four baronetcies created for persons with the surname Morris, all in the Baronetage of the United Kingdom. As of 2014 two of the creations are extant.

The Morris Baronetcy, of Clasemont in the County of Glamorgan, was created in the Baronetage of the United Kingdom on 12 May 1806 for the copper and coal magnate, John Morris. The 1st baronet had founded Morriston, the industrial suburb of Swansea, which was overlooked by the family seat at Clasemont. This residence was later knocked down and the stones were incorporated into a new family house at Sketty Park. Various lines died out, and the baronetcy eventually came to the 8th baronet, George Lockwood Morris, who succeeded at the age of 88, three months before his death. The 8th baronet had been a local industrialist and a Welsh international rugby player. The ninth baronet, the 8th baronet's son, was the painter and horticulturalist Cedric Morris. As of 28 February 2014 the present Baronet has not successfully proven his succession and is therefore not on the Official Roll of the Baronetage, with the baronetcy considered dormant since 1982.

The Morris Baronetcy, of Spiddal in the County of Galway, was created in the Baronetage of the United Kingdom on 14 September 1885. For more information on this creation, see the Baron Killanin.

The Morris Baronetcy, of Cavendish Square, in the Metropolitan Borough of Marylebone, London, was created in the Baronetage of the United Kingdom on 24 July 1909 for Henry Morris. The title became extinct on his death in 1926.

The 'Morris Baronetcy, of Nuffield in the County of Oxford, was created in the Baronetage of the United Kingdom on 27 March 1929. For more information on this creation, see the Viscount Nuffield.

Morris baronets, of Clasemont (1806)

Sir John Morris, 1st Baronet (1745–1819) 
Sir John Morris, 2nd Baronet (1775–1855) 
Sir John Armine Morris, 3rd Baronet (1813–1893) 
Sir Robert Armine Morris, 4th Baronet (1848–1927) 
Sir Tankerville Robert Armine Morris, 5th Baronet (1892–1937) 
Sir George Cecil Morris, 6th Baronet (1852–1940) 
Sir Herbert Edward Morris, 7th Baronet (1884–1947) 
Sir George Lockwood Morris, 8th Baronet (1859–1947) 
Sir Cedric Lockwood Morris, 9th Baronet (1889–1982) 
Sir Robert Byng Morris, 10th Baronet (1913–1999) 
Sir Allan Lindsay Morris, 11th Baronet (1961-2016)
Sir Sennen John Morris, 12th Baronet (b.1995)

The heir apparent is the present holder's brother Chace James Morris (born 1997).

Morris baronets, of Spiddal (1885)
see the Baron Killanin

Morris baronets, of Cavendish Square (1909)
Sir Henry Morris, 1st Baronet (1844–1926)

Morris baronets, of Nuffield (1929)
see the Viscount Nuffield

See also
Baron Morris

References

Kidd, Charles, Williamson, David (editors). Debrett's Peerage and Baronetage (1990 edition). New York: St Martin's Press, 1990.

Baronetcies in the Baronetage of the United Kingdom
Extinct baronetcies in the Baronetage of the United Kingdom